Rachael Elizabeth Watson,  (born 30 January 1992) is an Australian Paralympic swimmer. Watson represented Australia at the 2016 Rio Paralympics winning gold in the 50m Freestyle S4, a feat she repeated at the 2020 Tokyo Paralympics.

Personal
Watson was born on 30 January 1992. She is a triplet and has mild cerebral palsy however remained functionally independent. In her early 20's she acquired Guillain Barre Syndrome that led to severe muscle weakness and peripheral nervous system damage resulting in quadriplegia.

Swimming
Watson took up swimming as part of her rehabilitation from Guillain Barre Syndrome. The majority of competitions are held in a multi class (MC) format where each athlete swims against the world record for their classification and the swimmer with the highest point score wins the race. Watson has myopia and is unable to see the results score board at the end of the pool so remains unaware of her placing until she is told.

At the 2016 Rio Paralympics, Watson won the gold medal in the Women's 50m Freestyle S4 in a Paralympic record time of 40.13. Watson became the first swimmer classed S5 or below, to win gold for Australia this millennium.

Watson qualified for the 2017 World Championships but the competition was cancelled due to a major earthquake in Mexico occurring just a fortnight prior to the event. 

In 2018, Watson was chosen to volunteer at the Gold Coast 2018 Commonwealth Games. She could not compete as her swimming classification was not included in this competition. 

At the 2019 World Para Swimming Championships in London, Watson won the silver medal in the Women's 50m Freestyle S4 and the bronze medal in the Women's 100m Freestyle S4.  

At the postponed 2020 Tokyo Paralympics, Watson won the gold medal in the Women's 50m freestyle S4 in a Paralympic record time of 39.36.  

At the 2022 World Para Swimming Championships in Portugal, Watson won the silver medal in the Women's 50m Freestyle S4.

In 2022, Watson was chosen to volunteer at the Birmingham 2022 Commonwealth Games. She could not compete as her swimming classification was not included in this competition.

Watson trains at the Chandler Swimming Club in Brisbane.

Recognition
2016 – Australian Institute of Sport Discovery of the Year 

2016 – Sporting Wheelies and Disabled Association Most Improved Athlete 

2017 – Medal of the Order of Australia

2021 - University of Queensland Blue (university sport) Award for Sporting Excellence

2022 - University of Queensland Sportswoman of the Year

References

External links
 
 
 Swimming Australia

Female Paralympic swimmers of Australia
Swimmers at the 2016 Summer Paralympics
Swimmers at the 2020 Summer Paralympics
Paralympic gold medalists for Australia
Medalists at the 2016 Summer Paralympics
Medalists at the 2020 Summer Paralympics
Living people
1992 births
S4-classified Paralympic swimmers
Recipients of the Medal of the Order of Australia
Medalists at the World Para Swimming Championships
Paralympic medalists in swimming
Australian female freestyle swimmers